Narrenturm (Tower of Fools) may refer to:
 Narrenturm (novel), a fantasy novel by Andrzej Sapkowski
 Narrenturm (hospital), the world's first psychiatric hospital, located in Vienna, Austria

de:Narrenturm